Trevor Arnott (16 February 1902 – 2 February 1975) was a Welsh cricketer who played first-class cricket as an amateur from 1921 to 1935.

Arnott was a right-handed batsman who bowled right-arm fast-medium. He was born at Radyr, Glamorgan, and attended Monmouth School. He captained Glamorgan County Cricket Club in 1928, but was not successful, the county winning only two of their 26 County Championship matches amid disharmony on and off the field.

During the 1928 season he hit his highest score, 153 against Essex. He took his best bowling figures of 7 for 40 when Glamorgan beat the West Indian touring team in 1923. He toured Jamaica with Lord Tennyson's team in 1926–27 and 1927–28.

He is buried is in the churchyard at St Peter's Church, Dixton.

References

External links
Trevor Arnott at ESPNcricinfo
Trevor Arnott at CricketArchive

1902 births
1975 deaths
Cricketers from Cardiff
People educated at Monmouth School for Boys
Glamorgan cricketers
Glamorgan cricket captains
Wales cricketers
Welsh cricket captains
Gentlemen cricketers
North v South cricketers
Marylebone Cricket Club cricketers
Monmouthshire cricketers
Welsh cricket coaches
Oxford and Cambridge Universities cricketers
L. H. Tennyson's XI cricket team
Sir Julien Cahn's XI cricketers
H. D. G. Leveson Gower's XI cricketers